Kerry Tribe (born 1973) is an American visual artist who works primarily in film, video, and installation.

Early life
Tribe grew up in Cambridge and received a BA in 1997 from Brown University where she studied art and semiotics. She received a fellowship from the Whitney Independent Study Program in New York in 1998 and completed an MFA at the University of California, Los Angeles in 2002. During 2005–6, she was awarded a fellowship at the American Academy in Berlin. In 2012, she received a USA fellowship.

Works

There Will Be /Greystone, 2012
Tribe's 30-minute narrative short, Greystone, revisits one of the 20th century's most shocking and mysterious society murders. Filmed on location at Greystone Mansion in Beverly Hills California, in the very rooms where the killings took place, and using only dialog appropriated from dozens of Hollywood feature films that were also shot within the storied estate, Greystone proposes a series of explanations for how a Los Angeles oil tycoon and his personal assistant might actually have arrived at their deaths.

Critical Mass, 2012
Critical Mass is Kerry Tribe's tribute to Hollis Frampton's groundbreaking experimental film Critical Mass (1971). Hollis Frampton's original work captures an argument between a couple and cuts it up into a series of rhythmic, repetitive, fragmented phrases. For the Tate Museum in 2012 and the Museum of Modern Art in 2013, Tribe had actors Nick Huff and Emelie O'Hara reenact this classic structuralist film.

Milton Torres Sees a Ghost, 2010
In Tribe's installation, Milton Torres Sees a Ghost, magnetic audio-tape loops between two listening stations. Each listening station is equipped with a reel-to-reel audio player and an oscilloscope that displays a visual representation of the soundtrack. The soundtrack features the account of an American fighter pilot's encounter with a UFO over British air space in 1957, which was kept secret until the British government released records of the event in 2008. The testimony is edited so that, at times, the man seems to be describing the technology used to image the mysterious aircraft, whilst at other times he could be talking about technology present in the installation itself. As the tape moves around the space, it passes through two decks—one continuously lays the track down while the other erases it, therefore, providing visitors an intact soundtrack in one location and a fragmented version in another. The installation also includes censored and later declassified documents relating to the investigation of Milton Torres’ sighting.

The Last Soviet, 2010
The Last Soviet (2010) is a looping 10-minute video that tells the story of Russian cosmonaut Sergei Krikalev, who was stranded on the Mir space station for 311 days in 1991 during the collapse of the Soviet Union. Video footage of a model of the interior of Mir constructed in Tribe's studio is intercut with various archival materials related to this moment in history, including film footage of a performance of the ballet Swan Lake that was used to censor Russian news broadcasts of the political turmoil, images of tanks on the streets of Moscow, and photographs depicting aspects of the Russian space program. Throughout the image sequences, a male voiceover recounting the forgotten cosmonaut's story from a personal point of view in English with Russian subtitles alternates with a female voiceover giving a historical account of the period in Russian with English subtitles.

H.M., 2009
H.M. is a two-channel presentation of a single film looping through two projectors so that the right screen is shows a section of film 20 seconds after the left screen. The film is based on the true story of an anonymous, memory-impaired man, the famous amnesiac known in scientific literature only as "Patient H.M." In 1953, when he was 27 years old, H.M. underwent experimental brain surgery intended to alleviate his epilepsy. The unintended result was a radical and persistent amnesia. Though he was no longer able to make lasting memories, his short-term recall, lasting about 20 seconds, remained intact. The structure of the installation and the nature of the material together produce a sensation of mnemonic dissonance much like that experienced by Patient H.M.

Exquisite Corpse, 2016 
This video documentary follows the course of the  Los Angeles River. Its run-time is 51 minutes, matching the 51 mile length of the river.

Exhibitions
Her solo exhibitions include the Arnofini, Bristol, England (2010), Kunstlerhaus Bethanien, Berlin, Germany (2006), and Los Angeles Contemporary Exhibitions, Los Angeles (2003). Selected group exhibition include the Whitney Biennial, New York (2010); The Cinema Effect at the Hirshhorn Museum, Washington, D.C.; Exile of the Imaginary at the Generali Foundation, Vienna (2007); and Adaptive Behavior, New Museum of Contemporary Art, New York (2004). She also developed a performance called Critical Mass for the Tate Modern in 2012 and the Museum of Modern Art, New York in 2013.

Personal life
Kerry Tribe is married to artist Mungo Thomson. Her brother is new media artist and founder of Rhizome Mark Tribe, and her father is Harvard law professor Laurence Tribe.

References

External links

Kerry Tribe's home page

1973 births
Living people
American installation artists
New media artists
Jewish American artists
American video artists
Artists from Boston
Artists from Los Angeles
UCLA School of the Arts and Architecture alumni
21st-century American Jews